Di Tommaso is a surname. Notable people with the surname include:

 Apollonio di Giovanni di Tommaso, Italian painter
 Bartolomeo di Tommaso, Italian painter of the Umbro-Sienese school
 David Di Tommaso, French footballer
 Pascal Di Tommaso, French footballer
 Phoebe Di Tommaso, Australian competitive figure skater
 Piero di Tommaso Soderini, Italian statesman of the Republic of Florence
 Yohan Di Tommaso, French footballer

See also 

 De Tomaso
 Tommaso (disambiguation)

Patronymic surnames
Surnames from given names